Sidi Abdeldjebar  is a town and commune in Mascara Province, Algeria. According to the 2008 census it has a population of 4,190 .

References

Communes of Mascara Province
Cities in Algeria
Algeria